Maassen is a Dutch patronymic surname, meaning son of Maas, an archaic short form of Thomas. It is most common in Dutch Limburg and surrounding regions. Among variant forms are Maas, Maase(n), Maasse, Maes, and Maessen. In Germany the name is usually spelled Maaßen. Notable people with the surname include:

 (born 1970), German composer and pianist
Frans Maassen (born 1965), Dutch racing cyclist and directeur sportif
Friedrich Maassen (1823–1900), German jurist
Lambert Maassen (1941–2018), Dutch football forward
Nol Maassen (1922–2009), Dutch politician
Peter Maassen (1810–1890), German entomologist
Peter J. Maassen (born 1955), American jurist of the Alaska Supreme Court
Sascha Maassen (born 1969), German racing driver
Theo Maassen (born 1966), Dutch comedian and actor
Wolfgang Maassen (born 1949), German philatelist
Xavier Maassen (born 1980), Dutch racing driver
Maaßen
Hanns Maaßen (1908–1983), German journalist and writer
Hans-Georg Maaßen (born 1962), German politician and lawyer
 (1769–1834), Prussian jurist and politician
Maase
Kamiel Maase (born 1971), Dutch long-distance runner
Maase (noble family), Danish noble family

See also
Maasen, a community in Lower Saxony, Germany

References

Dutch-language surnames
Patronymic surnames
Surnames from given names